Monocystis (Gr., monos, single + kystisis, bladder) is a genus (the type of the family Monocystidae) of acephaline gregarines (subclass Gregarinasina) not having the protoplasm divided into segments by septa and including internal parasites of invertebrates (as M. agilis of the reproductive system of earthworms).

Habit and habitat
Monocystis lives as an intracellular parasite in its young stage when it lives in the bundle of developing sperms and becomes extracellular in its mature stage when it lives in the contents of seminal vesicles of earthworms. Its infection is so wide that practically all mature earthworms are found parasitized by this parasite.

Structure
The adult mature of Monocystis is called trophozoite which is a feeding stage. The young trophozoite lives in the sperm morula (sperm morula is a group of developing sperms) of the host; it feeds and grows at the expense of the protoplasm of the developing sperms until all the protoplasm is exhausted. So, it is now seen to be surrounded by the tails of the dead sperms. In this stage, it is sometimes mistaken to be a ciliated organism. But, soon the sperm tails are detached from its body and the trophozoite becomes free The adult is elongated, spindle shaped, flattened and worm like creature. Body is covered by thick smooth and permeable pellicle. Cytoplasm is well differentiated in to ectoplasm and endoplasm. endoplasm contains a large vesicular nucleus. It nutrition is sporozoic. there are no locomotory organs but it shows wriggling and gliding movements.

References

Conoidasida
Apicomplexa genera